= Florence Olasumbo Oyeyemi =

Nigerian politician and former Kwara State commissioner

Commissioner for Finance and Planning, Kwara State
- Governor: AbdulRahman AbdulRazaq

Personal details
- Party: All Progressives Congress
- Occupation: Politician

Florence Olasumbo Oyeyemi is a Nigerian politician and public administrator who served as the Commissioner for Finance and Planning in Kwara State, Nigeria under Governor AbdulRahman AbdulRazaq. She has been involved in public financial management and economic policy implementation in the state government

== Career ==
Oyeyemi served as Kwara State Commissioner for Finance and Planning, where she was responsible for managing the state's fiscal policies, budget planning, and financial transparency initiatives. During her tenure, the ministry introduced policies aimed at improving financial accountability, budget transparency, and public participation in the budgeting process.

She also played a role in implementing public financial management reforms, including the preparation of monitoring and evaluation reports and adoption of internationally recognised accounting standards in the state's financial system. As commissioner, Oyeyemi participated in several state initiatives focused on improving fiscal transparency and strengthening Kwara State's compliance with financial accountability programmes supported by the federal government and international institutions.

== Political activities ==
Oyeyemi has been active within the All Progressives Congress (APC) and served as the party's campaign spokesperson in Kwara State during the 2023 Nigerian general elections.In April 2026, she declared her intention to run for the House of Representatives seat representing Ekiti/Irepodun/Isin/Oke-Ero Federal Constituency, promising inclusive governance and stronger representation for women and communities in the constituency.

== Public administration ==
While serving in the Kwara State executive council, Oyeyemi was involved in several government programmes relating to fiscal governance, budget reform, and economic policy implementation.

She also participated in public engagements aimed at explaining state financial policies and ensuring transparency in budget revisions and economic planning.
